The Light Flyweight class in the boxing competition was the lightest class.  Light flyweights were limited to those boxers weighing less than 48 kilograms (105.8 lbs). 24 boxers qualified for this category. It was the first appearance of this category in Olympic Boxing competitions.

Like all Olympic boxing events, the competition was a straight single-elimination tournament. Both semifinal losers were awarded bronze medals, so no boxers competed again after their first loss. Bouts consisted of three three-minute rounds each. Five judges scored each bout.

Medalists

Schedule

Draw

References

Boxing at the 1968 Summer Olympics